Kukkurukuu is the second album by a Finnish band Mariska & Pahat Sudet. It was released on 14 September 2012. In the first week of release, the album peaked at number three on the Official Finnish Album Chart. According to IFPI Finland, the album sold 11,744 copies during 2012.

Themes 

Mariska has stated that the main themes on the album are death and love. She had previously suffered from a fear of death, but has since then learned to value life and live every day like her last. The title Kukkurukuu was inspired by a Mexican song ”Cucurrucucú paloma”.

Singles 

The  album has spawned three singles. "Liekki" was released in June 2012. Mariska has said that this song was inspired by both Leonard Cohen and her own heartaches. The title track was released as a single in August 2012 and remains the only song from the album to have appeared on the Official Finnish Singles Chart where it peaked at number 16. The third single "Kuolema on kalamies" was released in November 2012.

Track listing

Chart performance

References

Mariska (rapper) albums
2012 albums
Sony Music albums
Albums produced by Jukka Immonen
Finnish-language albums